The Arhat Hall is a hall used for enshrining an arhat or arhats in Chinese Buddhist temples. Arhat is another term for Arahant, one who has gained insight into the true nature of existence and has achieved Enlightenment and liberated from the endless cycle of rebirth. In Mahayana Buddhism, arhats rank the third position in Buddhism, only below the Buddhas and Bodhisattvas. In Theravada Buddhism, Lord Buddha is the first of the arahats, while his disciples who reach the goal by following his noble path also become arahats.

Statues 
In smaller Buddhist temples, statues of the Eighteen Arhats, the original followers of Gautama Buddha, are usually enshrined within the hall. In addition, statues of the four main Bodhisattvas in Chinese Buddhism, namely Guanyin, Ksitigarbha, Samantabhadra and Manjusri are often enshrined as well, along with the Wisdom King Mahamayuri.

Gallery

References

Bibliography

Further reading
 
 

Chinese Buddhist architecture